Bardwell is a village and civil parish in the West Suffolk district of Suffolk, England.

Location 
Bardwell is located about ten miles north-east of Bury St Edmunds between the villages of Ixworth, Stanton and Honington.

History 
The Domesday Book records the population of Bardwell in 1086 to be 86. The  River Blackbourne passes about half a mile west of the village. According to Eilert Ekwall the meaning of the village name is "Bearda's Spring" or brim/bank of spring.

Until the 20th century there were two working mills in Bardwell, a watermill and a windmill. The watermill has been converted into a house whilst the windmill which is a tower mill, built in 1829 was in the process of restoration to a working mill again which has recently been completed.

Church 
Bardwell has many old buildings including its medieval parish church. In the churchyard is the grave of Henry Addison, born in Bardwell in 1821 he joined the British Army and won the Victoria Cross for his heroic actions in the Indian Mutiny. He returned safely to Bardwell and died in 1887 aged 66 years.

There are eight bells that hang the church of St Peter and Paul, contrary the pub name of the six bells in the village, with the largest weighing 11cwt – 2qr – 27lb. The oldest bell, being the 7th, was cast in 1713 by Thomas Newman. They were restored and two new bells added in 2009 by Hayward Mills.

Bardwell Church St. Peter and Paul was built by Sir William Bardwell.

Amenities 
Amenities within the village of Bardwell include a post office and two pubs (the Dun Cow and the Six Bells). As in many village communities volunteer groups manage Bardwell Playing Field and the Tithe Barn which is the village hall both are used for village events. An engineering company, a marketing company and two equine centres are based in Bardwell. There is a primary school, Bardwell Church of England VC Primary School located in School Lane.

Notable residents
Henry Addison VC
John Cavell
Richard FitzLewis
Sir Bassingbourne Gawdy
Kenneth Carlisle
Frank Heilgers

References

External links 

Photos of Bardwell and surrounding area on geograph
Bardwell Village History
Bardwell CEVC Primary School

 
Villages in Suffolk
Civil parishes in Suffolk
Borough of St Edmundsbury